Lovćenac is a village located in the Mali Iđoš municipality, in the North Bačka District of Vojvodina, Serbia. The village is known as the de facto capital of Montenegrins in Serbia, and has a total population of 3,161 people (2011 census).

Name
In Serbian, the village is known as Lovćenac (Ловћенац), in German as Sekitsch (in the past rarely Winkelsberg), and in Hungarian as Szeghegy.

Its former name in Serbian was Sekić (Секић). After the World War II, the village was named Lovćenac by the Montenegrin settlers after Mount Lovćen in Montenegro.

The original Hungarian name of the village was Szeghegy, but Hungarians also used Serbian version of the name in the forms Szikics and Szekics, as well as Germans in the form Sekitsch. One very rare alternative German name was Winkelsberg.

History
After years of Ottoman-Hubsburg conflicts a policy of repopulation of the devastated Pannonian Basin was pursued during the reign of Maria Theresa and Joseph II. Ethnic German (predominantly Protestant) colonists known as Danube Swabians (German: Donauschwaben) settled the Bačka region, establishing the village Sekitsch in 1786. The economy and life of the village generally consisted of farming, trading, livestock breeding, viticulture and brewing. In 1849 the Battle of Hegyes (occasionally known as Szeghegy) was fought on the outskirts of the village as part of the Hungarian revolution, and war of independence.

Following World War I and the collapse of the Austro-Hungarian Empire, Sekitsch became part of the Kingdom of Serbs, Croats and Slovenes (later renamed Yugoslavia). This political shift caused ethnic Germans to become one of the largest minorities in Serbia, numbering approximately 330,000 people, or almost 5% of the total Yugoslav population. In 1936 the Summer Olympics torch relay passes through Sekitsch. During the April War of 1941 Hungarian troops entered Sekitsch, subsequently annexing the Bačka to the Kingdom of Hungary. As declared Volksdeutsche the villagers were tolerated by the new authority, though mandatory conscription in the Waffen SS was conducted. Sekitsch also harboured urban children as part of the Kinderlandverschickung program.

Following the war Germans left the country, together with the defeated German army. Those who remained were interned into prison camps. After camps were disbanded in 1948, most of the remaining Yugoslav Germans emigrated to Germany because of economic reasons in the next decades. After World War II, the village was colonized by settlers from Montenegro and Mt. Vlašić, Bosnia. The Montenegrins renamed the village in honor of Mt. Lovćen and account for the majority of the population.

Demographics

Ethnic Groups

The village of Lovćenac is predominantly inhabited by descendants of Montenegrins colonists who settled the village in the years following WWII (especially between 1945-48). Those claiming ancestry from Montenegro form the majority, with most espousing an ethnic Montenegrin identify whilst others declare as Serb. Another smaller group of Bosnian Serbs known as Vlašićani, deriving from villages on Mt. Vlašić and the Travnik area of Central Bosnia settled in Lovćenac during the 1950s and 60s.

Historical population

1822: 1,751
1850: 2,825
1970: 3,377
1885: 4,485
1900: 4,936
1910: 5,394
1945: 4,447
1948: 4,791
1961: 4,800
1971: 4,159
1981: 4,016
1991: 4,049
2002: 3,693
2011: 3,161

Culture
Village cultural life features several societies which strive to maintain and celebrate the diverse identity and traditions of Lovćenac. Being the epicentre of the Montenegrin community in Serbia, the village is home to the Association of Montenegrins of Serbia "Krstaš", alongside the Cultural Arts Society "Petar Petrović-Njegoš" and the Montenegrin Cultural and Educational Society "Princeza Ksenija". Since 2013 the Bosnian Serb descendants of Mount Vlašić have assembled within the Native Association "Vlašić". In sports Lovćenac is represented by Football Club Njegoš, which also features basketball and karate sub-branches. A modest collection of artefacts and historical content of the once thriving Danube Swabian community is located in the Sekitsch Museum. Community engagement in various associations and clubs had developed in the 20th century, with football becoming the most popular pastime following WWI when Sekitsch Sport Club was founded. The most important annual event for the ethnic German's was the annually celebration of the Evangelical Church Kirchweih. The majority of Lovćenac villagers today are of the Eastern Orthodox faith, with the Saint Peter of Cetinje Serbian Orthodox Church (SPC) servicing the spiritual needs of the community. In 2008 the canonically unrecognized Montenegrin Orthodox Church (CPC) laid foundations to build a church but construction was postponed due to protests from the SPC. Nevertheless the CPC remains an active party within the Montenegrin ethnic community of Lovćenac.

Notable people

 Mitar Pešikan, linguist and member of the Serbian Academy of Sciences and Arts
 Sofija Pekić, former female Serbian basketball player, Olympic bronze medalist
 Danilo Popivoda, Slovenian football player of Serbian descent
 Nenad Stevović, politician
 Radovan Stevović, author, Yugoslav Partisan and Montenegrin colonist leader 
 Peter Max Wagner, Danube Swabian humanitarian and refugee advocate

Twin towns – Sister cities
Lovćenac is twinned with:
  Cetinje, Montenegro
  Bar, Montenegro

See also
 Montenegrins of Serbia
 List of places in Serbia
 List of cities, towns and villages in Vojvodina

Notes

References
 Slobodan Ćurčić, Broj stanovnika Vojvodine, Novi Sad, 1996.

Gallery

External links 

 Krstaš
 Mi smo Crnogorci, sa azbukom od 33 slova, Glas javnosti, 5 February 2006 (about Montenegrins of the village)

Places in Bačka
Montenegrin communities